Alexandre De Bruyn (born 4 June 1994) is a Belgian professional footballer who plays for Challenger Pro League side Dender EH on loan from Kortrijk as an attacking midfielder.

Club career
He made his debut in the Belgian top flight on 28 July 2018 for Sint-Truiden starting against Cercle Brugge.

On 18 January 2022, De Bruyn signed a 2.5-year contract with Kortrijk, with the club option to extend for two more seasons. On 17 January 2023, he was loaned by Dender EH until the end of the season.

References

1994 births
Place of birth missing (living people)
Living people
Belgian footballers
Belgium youth international footballers
Association football forwards
Sint-Truidense V.V. players
Lommel S.K. players
K.A.A. Gent players
K.V. Kortrijk players
F.C.V. Dender E.H. players
Belgian Pro League players
Challenger Pro League players